Petru Maior (1761 in Marosvásárhely (now Târgu Mureș, Romania) – 14 February 1821 in Budapest) was a Romanian writer who is considered one of the most influential personalities of the Age of Enlightenment in Transylvania (the Transylvanian School). Maior was a member of the Greek-Catholic clergy, a historian, philosopher, and linguist.

Works
Petru Maior took a stand and responded, in 1812, by writing the "History of the Beginnings of the Romanians in Dacia" against all those who questioned the 
origin, character, and the becoming of his people.
Among his works are 
 "Didahii" (1809), 
 "Propovedanii" (1809), 
 "Prediche" (Sermons) (1810–1811) 
 "Istoria pentru începutul românilor în Dachia" (History of the beginnings of the Romanians in Dacia) (1812) 
 "Istoria Besearicei românilor" (History of Romanian Church) (1813).

He was a prolific writer, who  published everything he wrote during his lifetime except for two theological works: "Procanon" (1783) and "Protopopadichia" (The power of the archpriests) (1795).

References

Further reading 
 Petru Maior University: Our Patron
 Dicţionarul Teologilor Români – Petru Maior 

Romanian philosophers
Linguists from Romania
Romanian Greek-Catholic priests
Age of Enlightenment
Transylvanian School
People from Târgu Mureș
Romanians in Hungary
1756 births
1821 deaths
18th-century Romanian historians
19th-century Romanian historians